Patriotic War  is a term most commonly used in Russia. The term may refer to one of the following wars.

Wars between Russia and Western European powers 
Patriotic War of 1812, Napoleon's invasion of Russia
Second Patriotic War, the war between the German Empire and its allies against Russia during World War I
Great Patriotic War, the war between Nazi Germany and its allies against the Soviet Union during World War II
Great Patriotic War (term)

Other wars 
 The Croatian War of Independence, the war between the newly self-declared independent Croatia, on one side, and the self-declared Republic of Serbian Krajina and Yugoslav People's Army forces, both of whi which were controlled by SR Serbia, on the other
 The Second Nagorno-Karabakh War, the war between Azerbaijan and Armenia over the disputed Nagorno-Karabakh region.